Oxyaciura is a genus of tephritid  or fruit flies in the family Tephritidae.

Species
Oxyaciura formosae (Hendel, 1915)
Oxyaciura monochaeta (Bezzi, 1913)
Oxyaciura tibialis (Robineau-Desvoidy, 1830)
Oxyaciura xanthotricha (Bezzi, 1913)

References

Tephritinae
Tephritidae genera
Diptera of Africa
Diptera of Europe
Diptera of Asia